Tarvos , or Saturn XXI, is a prograde irregular satellite of Saturn. It was discovered by John J. Kavelaars et al. on September 23, 2000, and given the temporary designation S/2000 S 4. The name, given in August 2003, is after Tarvos, a deity depicted as a bull god carrying three cranes alongside its back from Gaulish mythology.

Orbit

Tarvos orbits Saturn at an average distance of 18 million km in 926 days and is about 15 km in diameter (assuming an albedo of 0.04). It has a high orbital eccentricity of 0.53.

It is a member of the Gallic group of irregular satellites.

Origin
With a similar orbit and displaying a similar light-red colour, Tarvos is thought to have its origin in the break-up of a common progenitor
or to be a fragment of Albiorix.

References 

Ephemeris IAU-MPC NSES

External links
Saturn's Known Satellites (by Scott S. Sheppard)

Gallic group
Moons of Saturn
Irregular satellites
20000923
Moons with a prograde orbit